Dzmitry Uladzimiravich Koptur (also Dmitry Koptur, ; born September 6, 1978) is a Belarusian former swimmer, who specialized in long-distance freestyle events. He is a 2000 Olympian and a three-time Belarusian record holder in the 400, 800, and 1500 m freestyle.

Koptur competed in three swimming events at the 2000 Summer Olympics in Sydney. He cleared a FINA A-standard entry time of 15:27.86 (400 m freestyle) from the European Championships in Helsinki, Finland. On the first day of the Games, Koptur placed twenty-second in the 400 m freestyle. Swimming in heat four, he rounded out the field to last place by almost ten seconds behind winner Massimiliano Rosolino of Italy in 3:55.26. Four days later, Koptur teamed up with Pavel Lagoun, Igor Koleda, and Valeryan Khuroshvili in the 4 × 200 m freestyle relay. Swimming the third leg, Koptur recorded a split of 1:51.14, but the Belarusians fell short to sixth place and twelfth overall in a final time of 7:24.83. In his final event, 1500 m freestyle, Koptur challenged seven other swimmers in heat three, including top favorites Ricardo Monasterio of Venezuela and Spyridon Gianniotis of Greece. He held off Gianniotis by seven hundredths of a second (0.07) to earn a second spot in a time of 15:29.62. Koptur failed to reach the top 8 final, as he placed twentieth overall on the last day of prelims.

References

1978 births
Living people
Belarusian male freestyle swimmers
Olympic swimmers of Belarus
Swimmers at the 2000 Summer Olympics
Sportspeople from Minsk